Charles Noble (9 February 1850 – 8 March 1927) was an English first-class cricketer active 1867–68 who played for Surrey. He was born in Kennington; died in Trowbridge.

References

1850 births
1927 deaths
English cricketers
Surrey cricketers
Gentlemen of the South cricketers